Carlos Salamanca was the defending champion, but he was eliminated by unseeded Reda El Amrani in the quarterfinals.
João Souza became the champion after defeating Reda El Amrani 6–4, 7–6(5) in the final.

Seeds

Draw

Finals

Top half

Bottom half

References
Main Draw
Qualifying Singles

Copa Petrobras Bogota - Singles
Copa Petrobras Bogotá